Wrestling at the 2021 Islamic Solidarity Games were held in Konya, Turkey from 10 to 13 August 2022. Each National Olympic Committee (NOC) has the right to participate with a maximum of
one wrestler per weight category in all styles (Greco-Roman, women and freestyle). The
maximum number of athletes per delegation is 30.All competitors must be of senior age category (born on or before 31 December 2004). The competitions take place by direct elimination system with an ideal number of
wrestlers, i.e. 4, 8, 16, 32, 64, etc. If there is no ideal number of wrestlers in a category,
qualification matches will take place. Matching is done in the order of numbers determined
by the draw made by UWW. 4 Each weight category begins and ends in a day. The competition takes place in the following format: Elimination rounds, Semi-finals, Repechage rounds, Finals.

The Games were originally scheduled to take place from 20 to 29 August 2021. In May 2020, the Islamic Solidarity Sports Federation (ISSF), who are responsible for the direction and control of the Islamic Solidarity Games, postponed the games as the 2020 Summer Olympics were postponed to July and August 2021, due to the global COVID-19 pandemic.

Competition schedule
All times are (UTC+3)

Medal table

Medalists

Men's freestyle

Men's Greco-Roman

Women's freestyle

Participating nations
A total of 253 athletes from 31 nations competed in wrestling at the 2021 Islamic Solidarity Games:

Gallery

References

External links
Official website
Results

2021 Islamic Solidarity Games
Islamic Solidarity Games
2021
International wrestling competitions hosted by Turkey